Bahlingen am Kaiserstuhl is a municipality in the district of Emmendingen, Baden-Württemberg, southwestern Germany.

Geography

Bahlingen am Kaiserstuhl is situated on the edge of the volcanic region Kaiserstuhl, on the banks of the river "Alte Dreisam", about 20 km north-west of Freiburg im Breisgau,

The Kaiserstuhl, where Bahlingen is situated, is one of the warmest regions in Germany. This Mediterranean climate produces quality wines.

History

The name of the village presumably originates from 'Baldinga', which means roughly "among Baldo's people". It was first mentioned in a document in 762.  However, it is likely that Alemannic tribes had settled on the territory as early as the 3rd - 5th century. From 1415 on, Bahlingen belonged to the Markgrafschaft Baden (Margraviate Baden)  and therefore it became Protestant during the Reformation. During the Thirty Year's War and again in the wars waged by the French King Louis XIV, the place was almost completely destroyed. During both World Wars, however, Bahlingen came through widely undamaged.

Coat of Arms

The design of the shield is split in two parts: On the left side, the image shows a read bend on a golden background. On the right side, there is a vine knife with a black handle over a tilted silver ploughshare.

Twinning Arrangement

Since 1996, Bahlingen has been twinned with several French villages in the Alsace region:

Bischwihr, Holtzwihr, Riedwihr and Wickerschwihr.

Economy and Infrastructure

For a long time in history, Bahlingen was characterized by agriculture and wine growing. In the last hundred years, however, the village has been modernized. In 1896, the place was connected to the railway net Kaiserstuhlbahn (Kaiserstuhl Railway). In the following years, the infrastructure was constantly enlarged. Since the 1970s, trade and industry increasingly settled in Bahlingen. Currently, there are about 1000 jobs available.

Viticulture

Wine-growing in this region reaches back to the Roman Age. Currently, Bahlingen cultivates about 280 hectares of vines. Wineries and the cooperative 'Winzer vom Silberberg' (The Vintners of the Silver Mountain) cultivate and sell  the wine. The vintners farm a grape variety  of Müller-Thurgau (a white grape variety), Pinot Noir, Pinot Blanc and Pinot Gris.

Architecture

The mountain church with stained glass windows by Valentin Peter Feuerstein towers over the village. Some  historical Fachwerkhäuser (half-timbered houses) are characteristic for the overall appearance of the locality. The town hall with its rich half-timbered structure dates back to the 17th century.

Sports

Bahlingen's soccer team Bahlinger SC plays in the Regionalliga Südwest (regional league south-west), which  ranks fourth in Germany's soccer leagues.

References

Emmendingen (district)